AC Vert-Pré is a football club of Martinique, based in the eastern village Vert-Pré in the commune Le Robert.

Founded in 1950, the club plays in Martinique's first division, the Martinique Championnat National.

External links
 Club info – French Football Federation

References

Vert-Pre
Vert-Pre
1950 establishments in Martinique